D52 or D52 road may refer to:

roads:
 D52 road (Croatia), a road connecting Otočac and Korenica
 D52 road (Calvados), a road connecting Pont-Farcy and Vire, France
 D52 road (Drôme), a road near Geyssans, France
 D52 road (Nord), an ancient Roman road connecting Cassel to the sea
 D52 motorway (Czech Republic)

other:
 HMS Enterprise (D52), a 1918 Emerald-class light cruiser of the British Royal Navy
 INS Rana (D52), a 1982 Rajput class destroyer of the Indian Navy
 JNR Class D52, a 2-8-4 class of Japanese locomotives
 Folate deficiency's ICD-10 code
 The FAA location identifier of Geneseo Airport in Geneseo, New York